The End of Silence is the fifth release and the third full-length album by the Rollins Band, led by former Black Flag singer Henry Rollins. The album's cover features a stylized drawing of the sun identical to the one tattooed on Rollins' back. The album's liner notes credit the artwork to California tattoo artist Rick Spellman.

In Metal Hammer's list of the top 10 albums of 1992, they describe the album as "taut, ferocious, withering" and that it is "the record that took Rollins from hardcore punk renaissance man to bona fide alt-rock icon."

Track listing 
All songs written by Henry Rollins, Chris Haskett, Andrew Weiss and Sim Cain.
 "Low Self Opinion" – 5:18
 "Grip" – 4:50
 "Tearing" – 4:58
 "You Didn't Need" – 5:30
 "Almost Real" – 8:03
 "Obscene" – 8:50
 "What Do You Do" – 7:22
 "Blues Jam" – 11:46
 "Another Life" – 4:39
 "Just Like You" – 10:57

The album was recorded in Dover, New Jersey.

Accolades

Personnel 

Rollins Band
Sim Cain – drums
Chris Haskett – guitar
Henry Rollins – vocals
Andrew Weiss – bass guitar
Theo Van Rock  – engineering

Additional musicians and production
Theo Van Rock  – engineering
Andy Wallace – production, engineering, mixing
Howie Weinberg – mastering

Chart performance 

Album

Singles

References 

Rollins Band albums
Albums produced by Andy Wallace (producer)
1992 albums